Shiceng Dashan() is a mountain at the junction of the borders of Laos, China and Vietnam.

According to the news report, the three countries have a border dispute in which a pending agreement is on the table. There is a monolith at the top marking the tripoint spot.

Its name means "ten layer big mountain".

References

External links
 Shiceng Dashan Mountain Issue – Tri Point Border
 China, Vietnam and Laos Sign the Treaty on Definition of the Tri-Junction Point of the National Boundaries
 Signing of Agreement

Mountains of China
China–Vietnam border
Laos–Vietnam border
China–Laos border
Mountains of Vietnam
Mountains of Laos
International mountains of Asia
Mountains of Yunnan
Geography of Pu'er